Dimitris Rizos (born 7 October 1976) is a Greek football goalkeeper. He currently playing for Keraunos Pernis F.C.

Rizos played for Egaleo F.C., appearing in five league matches during two seasons in the Greek Superleague.

References

External links
 Player on paokfc.gr
Profile at gate3.gr

1976 births
Living people
Greek footballers
Association football goalkeepers
Super League Greece players
Cypriot First Division players
Cypriot Second Division players
Doxa Katokopias FC players
Egaleo F.C. players
Pierikos F.C. players
PAOK FC players
Olympiakos Nicosia players
Expatriate footballers in Cyprus
Panegialios F.C. players
People from Kavala (regional unit)
Footballers from Eastern Macedonia and Thrace